William Smyth (February 2, 1797 – April 3, 1868) was an American academic and writer on mathematics and other subjects.

Early life
William Smyth was born in Pittston, Maine on February 2, 1797. He graduated from Bowdoin College in 1822, then studied theology at Andover Theological Seminary.

Career
In 1825, he became a professor of mathematics at Bowdoin College, and in 1846 became an associate professor of natural philosophy. The Bowdoin College Department of Mathematics Smyth Prize is named in his honor.

Smyth was an ardent abolitionist of slavery and supporter of the temperance movement. While at Bowdoin, Smyth supported the effort to the First Parish Church, which is now on the National Register of Historic Places.

Personal life
Smyth married Harriet Porter, daughter of Mary (née Porter) and Nathaniel Coffin. They had nine children.

He died in Brunswick, Maine in April 1868. He is interred at Pine Grove Cemetery in Brunswick.

Bibliography 
Smyth wrote several widely used textbooks:

 Elements of Algebra (1833) digitized version
 Elementary Algebra for Schools (1850) digitized version
 Treatise on Algebra" (1852) digitized version
 Trigonometry, Surveying, and Navigation(1855) digitized version
 Elements of Analytical Geometry" (1855)
 Elements of the Differential and Integral Calculus" (1856; 2d ed., 1859)  digitized version
 Lectures on Modern History, edited by Jared Sparks (1849) digitized version

References 

 Bowdoin College Catalogue 1840-1848. Bowdoin College Catalogue. George J. Mitchell Department of Special Collections & Archives. Bowdoin College Library.

External links 
 Smyth Prize
 An article whose original source is the controversial Appleton's Cyclopedia of American Biography, originally published in 1887-1889, and republished in 1999.

1797 births
1868 deaths
19th-century American mathematicians
Bowdoin College alumni
19th-century American male writers
People from Kennebec County, Maine
People from Brunswick, Maine
Writers from Maine
Burials at Pine Grove Cemetery (Brunswick, Maine)